Calonotos aequimaculatus is a moth of the subfamily Arctiinae. It was described by Zerny in 1931. It is found in Brazil.

References

Arctiinae
Moths described in 1931